Rayón is a town and municipality in San Luis Potosí in central Mexico.

History
Spanish settlement in the area that became the municipality began in 1617 with the founding of a Franciscan mission by Fr. Juan Bautista Mollinedo and Fr. Juan de Cárdenas,  The mission was called "San Felipe de los Gamotes". The mission was abandoned as the local Indians died out or fled to the mountains.

On 8 October 1827 the town of Nuevo Gamotes was formally established.

Settlements

Notes and references

Municipalities of San Luis Potosí